Fatal Distraction may refer to

Fatal Distraction (Mario song) (redirect)
Fatal Distraction (2010) Pulitzer Prize for Feature Writing 2010 by Gene Weingarten of The Washington Post 
"Fatal Distraction" also titled "Who's at the Controls?", episode about Eastern Air Lines Flight 401
"Fatal Distraction" 2011 show by Chris Cox (magician)